Iselica alta is a species of sea snail, a marine gastropod mollusk in the family Amathinidae.

Description
The length of the shell attains 1.4 mm.

Original Description
  (of Iselica altum Poppe, Tagaro & Goto, 2018) Poppe G.T., Tagaro S.P. & Goto Y. (2018). New marine species from the Central Philippines. Visaya. 5(1): 91-135. page(s): 114, pl. 14 figs 4–5.

Distribution
This marine species occurs off the Philippines.

References

External links

 Worms Link

Amathinidae
Gastropods described in 2018